Qarachi was the highest level of noble within Turkic khanates of the 14th through 16th centuries, such as Siberia Khanate and Kazan Khanate. The name could be applied to the member of the four extended families: Shirin (Şirin), Barghen (Barğın), Arghen (Arğın), Qepchaq (Qıpçaq). These four were the leading non-royal clans of the Crimean Khanate.

See also 
 List of Turkic states and empires

History of Tatarstan
Khanate of Sibir
Turkic words and phrases